Hitchin Rugby Club is a rugby club based in Hitchin, Hertfordshire, England.  They currently play in Counties 1 Herts / Middlesex - a league at the 7th level of the English rugby union system - following their promotion from London 3 North West in the 2021-22 season.

Formation

The club was formed in 1954. Highlights have included playing at Twickenham in the final of the national Junior RFU Cup in 1993, and the establishment of the country's first Academy. The Club received the RFU 'Club Seal of Approval' in 2012.

Men's rugby

Hitchin's 1st XV competes in the Counties 1 Herts / Middlesex league following the club's promotion from London 3 North West at the end of the 2021/22 season, whilst also running two senior sides in the Herts/Middlesex merit tables. Hitchin finished the 2018-19 season as champions of Herts/Middlesex 1, returning to London 3 North West at the first attempt.

Youth rugby

The Mini and Youth Section was founded in 1988. The section currently has a membership of over 650, running teams for boys and girls aged 5-18.

Women's rugby

The Ladies 1xv team currently play in Women's Championship Midlands 2, the third tier of Women's rugby, following promotion as champions of Women's NC1 Midlands in the 2019-20 season. The Ladies 2xv team, founded in the 2019/20 season, currently play in women's NC2 South East (North), the fifth tier of Women's rugby.

Club Honours 
Hertfordshire 2 champions: 1988–89
Herts/Middlesex 1 champions (2): 2004-05, 2018-19
Hertfordshire Presidents' Trophy winners: 2005

References

External links
 Official Hitchin Rugby Club Site
RSS Feed

English rugby union teams
Rugby union clubs in Hertfordshire
Hitchin